Sulfatase-modifying factor 1 is an enzyme that in humans is encoded by the SUMF1 gene.

Sulfatases catalyze the hydrolysis of sulfate esters such as glycosaminoglycans, sulfolipids, and steroid sulfates. C-alpha-formylglycine (FGly), the catalytic residue in the active site of eukaryotic sulfatases, is posttranslationally generated from a cysteine by SUMF1, the human form of the aerobic Formylglycine-generating enzyme (FGE), in the endoplasmic reticulum (ER). The genetic defect of FGly formation caused by mutations in the SUMF1 gene results in inactive FGE, and subsequently multiple sulfatase deficiency (MSD; MIM 272200), a lysosomal storage disorder (Roeser et al., 2006).[supplied by OMIM]

References

Further reading